The North Wabassie River is a river in northeastern Kenora District in northwestern Ontario, Canada. It is in the James Bay drainage basin and is a right tributary of the Atikameg River.

The North Wabassie River begins in muskeg and flows north to its mouth at the Atikameg River. The Atikameg River flows via the Kapiskau River to James Bay.

References

Sources

Rivers of Kenora District